Clavatula solangeae is a species of sea snail, a marine gastropod mollusk in the family Clavatulidae.

Description
The size of an adult shell varies between 42 mm and 50 mm.

Distribution
This species occurs in the Indian Ocean off Madagascar.

References

 Bozzetti L. (2006) Clavatula solangeae (Gastropoda: Hypsogastropoda: Clavatulidae) nuova specie dal Madagascar Meridionale. Malacologia Mostra Mondiale 52: 10-11

External links
 

solangeae
Gastropods described in 2006